Sarangesa brigida, commonly known as Brigid's elfin, is a species of butterfly in the family Hesperiidae. It is found in Guinea-Bissau, Guinea, Sierra Leone, Liberia, Ivory Coast, Ghana, Nigeria, Cameroon, Gabon, the Central African Republic, the Democratic Republic of the Congo, Sudan, Uganda, Kenya, Tanzania and Zambia. The habitat consists of forest edges and clearings.

Subspecies
Sarangesa brigida brigida - Guinea-Bissau, Guinea, Sierra Leone, Liberia, Ivory Coast, Ghana, Nigeria, western Cameroon
Sarangesa brigida atra Evans, 1937 - eastern Uganda, western Kenya, north-western Tanzania
Sarangesa brigida sanaga Miller, 1964 - Cameroon, Gabon, Central African Republic, Democratic Republic of Congo, southern Sudan, western Uganda, north-western Zambia

References

Butterflies described in 1879
Celaenorrhinini
Butterflies of Africa